Sidney Cristiano dos Santos(born 20 July 1981 in Rio de Janeiro, Brazil) better known as Tita, is a professional footballer who most recently played for Nevşehir Belediyespor. He took the Turkish name Melih Gökçek after taking Turkish citizenship in 2011.

References

External links
Profile at weltfussball.de  

Profile at CBF 

1981 births
MKE Ankaragücü footballers
Brazilian footballers
Turkish footballers
Footballers from Rio de Janeiro (city)
Living people
Brazilian emigrants to Turkey
Turkish people of Brazilian descent
Brazilian people of Turkish descent
Brazilian expatriate footballers
Brazilian expatriate sportspeople in Turkey
Expatriate footballers in Turkey
Süper Lig players
Ituano FC players
Antalyaspor footballers
Ankaraspor footballers
Naturalized citizens of Turkey
Association football midfielders
Converts to Islam